Obarzanek may refer to:

 Gideon Obarzanek (born 1966), Australian choreographer
 alternative spelling of obwarzanek, a Polish bread